Kathleen Sgambati is a former Democratic member of the New Hampshire Senate, representing the 4th District between 2006 through 2010.

Legislative Recognitions
American Medical Association (AMA) State Legislator of the Year (2008)

After School Alliance 2008 After School For All City Champion

NH Women's Lobby 2007 Meritorious Service Award

NH Health Care Association 2007 Legislator of the Year

External links
Follow the Money - Kathleen G Sgambati
2006 campaign contributions

Democratic Party New Hampshire state senators
Living people
Year of birth missing (living people)
Women state legislators in New Hampshire
21st-century American women